Christ Episcopal Church is a historic church building in Benson, Minnesota, United States.  It is Benson's oldest church, built in 1879 as part of the Episcopal Church's ambitious expansion into western Minnesota under Bishop Henry Benjamin Whipple.

It was listed on the National Register of Historic Places in 1985 as Christ Church-Episcopal for having local significance in the themes of architecture and religion.  It was nominated for its association with Bishop Whipple's missionary program, for symbolizing Benson's English and New Englander settlers, for being Benson's oldest church building, and for its early Gothic Revival architecture.

Its board and batten walls, side-entry bell tower, and lancet windows and door are all typical of Carpenter Gothic architecture.  The congregation sold the building in 1966 to make way for construction of a high-rise apartment.  The 87-year-old church building escaped demolition; it was moved south across the road (at which point it was rotated 180° to maintain its street-facing façade).  It was repurposed as a senior center.

See also
 List of Anglican churches
 National Register of Historic Places listings in Swift County, Minnesota

References

19th-century Episcopal church buildings
1879 establishments in Minnesota
Carpenter Gothic church buildings in Minnesota
Churches completed in 1879
Benson, Minnesota
Churches in Swift County, Minnesota
Churches on the National Register of Historic Places in Minnesota
Episcopal church buildings in Minnesota
National Register of Historic Places in Swift County, Minnesota
Relocated buildings and structures in Minnesota